SIGMETRICS is the Association for Computing Machinery's Special Interest Group on Measurement and Evaluation, which specializes in the field of performance analysis, measurement, and modeling of computer systems.  It is also the name of an annual 'flagship' conference, organized by SIGMETRICS since 1973, which is considered to be the leading conference in performance analysis and modeling in the world.  Known to have an extremely competitive acceptance rate (~15%), many of the landmark works in the area have been published through it.

Beyond the flagship conference, SIGMETRICS also promotes research into performance evaluation through a number of other activities.  It co-sponsors other prestigious conferences: the Internet Measurement Conference (IMC), the International Conference on Performance Engineering (ICPE), the IEEE/ACM Symposium on Quality of Service (IWQoS), the ACM International Conference on Systems for Energy-Efficient Built Environments (BuildSys), and the ACM Conference on Embedded Network Sensor Systems (SenSys). In addition, every third year the SIGMETRICS conference is held jointly with IFIP performance.  Additionally, SIGMETRICS produces a newsletter, Performance Evaluation Review, with both peer-reviewed and editorial content.

SIGMETRICS has four awards that are given out on an annual basis: 
 The SIGMETRICS Achievement Award, which recognizes a senior researcher who has made long-lasting influential contributions to computer/communication  performance evaluation.
 The SIGMETRICS Rising Star Award, which recognizes a junior researcher who demonstrates outstanding potential for research in computer/communication  performance evaluation.
 The SIGMETRICS Test of Time Award, which recognizes an influential SIGMETRICS paper from 10–12 years previously.
 The SIGMETRICS Doctoral Dissertation Award, which recognizes excellent thesis research by doctoral candidates.

History

The group was formed as SIGME (Special Interest Committee on Measurement and Evaluation) in 1971, the name was changed to SIGMETRICS in 1972.

Awards

Each year the group gives three awards, the lifetime achievement award, rising star award and test of time award.

Achievement award

The achievement award is given each year to an individual who has made "long-lasting, influential contributions to the theory or practice of computer/communication system performance evaluation."

 2022 Balaji Prabhakar
 2021 R. Srikant
 2020 Leandros Tassiulas
 2019 Mary K. Vernon
 2018 Jim Dai
 2017 Sem Borst
 2016 John Tsitsiklis
 2015 Bruce Hajek
 2014 François Baccelli
 2013 Jean Walrand
 2012 Debasis Mitra
 2011 Onno J. Boxma
 2010 Jeffrey P. Buzen
 2009 Frank Kelly
 2008 Erol Gelenbe
 2007 Don Towsley
 2006 Richard R. Muntz
 2005 Stephen S. Lavenberg
 2004 Ken C. Sevcik
 2003 Edward G. Coffman, Jr.

Rising star award

The rising star award is given each year to an individual who "demonstrates outstanding potential for research in the field of computer and communication performance."

 2022 Giulia Fanti
 2021 Zhenhua Liu
 2020 Kuang Xu
 2019 Anshul Gandhi
 2018 Longbo Huang
 2017 Sewoong Oh
 2016 Yi Lu
 2015 Jinwoo Shin
 2014 Florian Simatos
 2013 Augustin Chaintreau
 2012 Marc Lelarge
 2011 Adam Wierman
 2010 Milan Vojnovic
 2009 Alexandre Proutiere
 2008 Devavrat Shah

Test of time award

The test of time award is given annually to the authors of papers whose "impact is still felt 10-12 years after its initial publication."

2022

2021

2020

2019

2018

2017

2016

2015

2014

2013

2012

2011

2010

Doctoral Dissertation award

The doctoral dissertation award is given each year to an individual to recognize excellent thesis research by doctoral candidates in the field of performance evaluation analysis of computer systems.

 2022 Ziv Scully

References

External links
 SIGMETRICS

Association for Computing Machinery Special Interest Groups